This is a list of the squads for the 2008 CONCACAF Under-20 Women's Championship, which was held in Mexico between June 17 and June 28, 2008. The 8 national teams involved in the tournament were required to register a squad of 20 players each, two of whom must be goalkeepers; only players in these squads were eligible to take part in the tournament.

Group A

Cuba 

Coach:  Rufino Sotolongo

Mexico 

Coach:  Andrea Rodebaugh

Trinidad and Tobago 

Coach:  Marlon Charles

United States 

Coach:  Tony DiCicco

Group B

Canada 

Coach:  Bob Birarda

Costa Rica 

Coach:  Juan Diego Quesada

Jamaica 

Coach:  Luciano Gama

Nicaragua 

Coach:  Eduardo Urroz

References

External links 
CONCACAF Mexico 2008 Under-20 Women's Championship Recap

squads